Arena Vänersborg is an indoor arena in Vänersborg, Sweden. It is used for bandy, concerts and other events. 

The arena serves as home field for IFK Vänersborg. It also hosted the 2013 Bandy World Championship, when for the second time Division A and Division B were separate events, and the 2019 Bandy World Championship.

Communication 
The arena can be reached by car or by Västtrafik buses (bus stops Sportcentrum or Tenggrenstorp).

Controversies 
The arena has been the target of high local press attention, because of the high cost overrun. The city has approved a cost of just over SEK 100 million, although the end cost has been around SEK 230 million (USD 28 million at exchange rate of 2009).

References

External links 

Indoor arenas in Sweden
Bandy venues in Sweden
Buildings and structures in Västra Götaland County
Vänersborg Municipality
Bandy World Championships stadiums
Sports venues completed in 2009
2009 establishments in Sweden